Thomas Hughes (fl. 1571 – 1623) was an English lawyer and dramatist.

A native of Cheshire, Hughes entered Queens' College, Cambridge, in 1571. He graduated and became a fellow of his college in 1576, and was afterwards a member of Gray's Inn.

Works
Hughes wrote The Misfortunes of Arthur, Uther Pendragon's son reduced into tragical notes, which was performed at Greenwich in Queen Elizabeth I's presence on the 28 February 1588. Nicholas Trotte provided the introduction, Francis Flower the choruses of Acts I and II, William Fulbecke two speeches, while three other gentlemen of Gray's Inn, one of whom was Francis Bacon, undertook the care of the dumb show.

The argument of the play, based on a story of incest and crime, was borrowed, in accordance with Senecan tradition, from mythical history, and the treatment is in close accordance with the model. The ghost of Gorlois, who was slain by Uther Pendragon, opens the play with a speech that reproduces passages spoken by the ghost of Tantalus in Seneca's play Thyestes; the tragic events are announced by a messenger, and the chorus comments on the course of the action. Dr W. J. Cunliffe has proved that Hughes's memory was saturated with Seneca, and that the play may be resolved into a patchwork of translations, with occasional original lines. Appendix II to his exhaustive essay On the Influence of Seneca on Elizabethan Tragedy (1893) gives a long list of parallel passages.

The Misfortunes of Arthur was reprinted in J. P. Collier's supplement to Dodsley's Old Plays; and by Harvey Carson Grumline (Berlin, 1900), who points out that Hughes's source was Geoffrey of Monmouth's Historia Britonum, not the Morte D'Arthur.

References

Notes

Attribution

16th-century births
17th-century deaths
English dramatists and playwrights
English lawyers
People from Cheshire
17th-century English writers
17th-century English male writers
Alumni of Queens' College, Cambridge
English male dramatists and playwrights
16th-century English lawyers